The Langensee is a lake in the North German lakeland region of Holstein Switzerland.
It lies on the River Schwentine between the lakes of Dieksee (upstream) and Behler See (downstream).

External links 

 Fünf-Seen-Fahrt (Five Lakes Travel) 

Lakes of Schleswig-Holstein
LLangensee